Peter Bell II: The Hunt For The Czar Crown is a 2003 Dutch family film, directed by Maria Peters, based on the Pietje Bell books of Chris van Abkoude.

The film received a Golden Film (100,000 visitors) in December 2003 and Platinum Film (400,000 visitors) in January 2004. The film takes place in 1930's Rotterdam.

References

External links

2003 films
2000s Dutch-language films
Films based on Dutch novels
2000s children's comedy films
Dutch children's films
2003 comedy films